Richard Milner may refer to:

 Richard Milner (historian), historian of science and singer
 Richard Milner, 3rd Baron Milner of Leeds (born 1959), British peer
 H. Richard Milner, IV (born 1974), American educator